Steel Venom is an inverted launched roller coaster located at Valleyfair amusement park in Shakopee, Minnesota, United States.

History
Valleyfair unveiled Steel Venom in September 2002, a new roller coaster for the 2003 season manufactured by Intamin. It is an Impulse Coaster model, compact by design, and Valleyfair's first inverted launch coaster. Steel Venom opened to the public on May 17, 2003.

Ride description

The coaster's single seven-car (28-passenger) train runs along a 200 m (656 ft) U-shaped track, incorporating two  vertical spikes.  The forward spike incorporates a twisted spiral, and the rearward spike provides a straight freefall.  The 20 m (65 ft) train, propelled by linear induction motors (LIMs,) is accelerated in less than four seconds to  toward the forward tower before dropping back down through the station house and up the rearward tower.  A holding brake is incorporated on the rear straight tower and is able to suspend the train momentarily (usually on the final ascent during each ride) before dropping it back down to the station house.

References

External links

Official page

Roller coasters operated by Cedar Fair
Roller coasters in Minnesota
Valleyfair